As the Dark Against My Halo is a 2012 studio album by The Crüxshadows, released by Wishfire Records.
It was also available at the last concerts of their tour.

Style and concept
The album features a mix of Dark Wave, synthpop and alternative rock.

The album has been inspired by mythology and literature. According to singer Rogue, the song "Matchstick Girl" refers to Hans Christian Andersen's fairy tale The Little Match Girl.

Reception

As the Dark Against My Halo received mixed reviews from the musical press.

Terrorizer marked the quality of the production and specifically lauded the string arrangements. The Sonic Seducer was equally positive about the songwriting and instrumentation, and noted a more complex sound compared to earlier works of the band. The reviewer criticised however that the album lacked bass tones and had been produced too high-pitched.

Online music magazines and blogs were often less kind. Reflections of Darkness offered "Call it as you wish but I prefer to call it imagery of Prussian bureaucrats suffering from insomnia."

Brutal Resonance added that "Beats are weak farts, synths sounds have no power and depth, and the violins sound like they are recorded through bad microphones in a shed."

Charts
The album is the first of the band's albums to reach the #1 position on The German Alternative Charts (DAC).  The single Quicksilver, a featured song on the album, reached the #1 position on the Billboard Hot Dance Singles Sales Chart and the #2 position on the Billboard Hot Singles Sales Chart in the USA

Track listing

References

2012 albums
The Crüxshadows albums